Samirum may refer to:
 Izadkhvast, a city in Fars Province, Iran
 Semirom, a city in Isfahan Province, Iran
 Esfarjan, a village in Isfahan Province, Iran